Leonel Gabriel (13 July 1919 – 21 January 2005) was a Uruguayan water polo player. He competed in the men's tournament at the 1948 Summer Olympics.

References

1919 births
2005 deaths
Uruguayan male water polo players
Olympic water polo players of Uruguay
Water polo players at the 1948 Summer Olympics
Sportspeople from Montevideo